Shawn Dennis (born 27 October 1965) is a professional basketball head coach for Nagoya Diamond Dolphins of Japan's B.League.

Head coaching record

|- 
| style="text-align:left;"|Shiga Lakestars
| style="text-align:left;"|2017-18
| 60||24||36|||| style="text-align:center;"|3rd in Western|||-||-||-||
| style="text-align:center;"|-
|- 
| style="text-align:left;"|Shiga Lakestars
| style="text-align:left;"|2018-19
| 60||18||42|||| style="text-align:center;"|5th in Western|||-||-||-||
| style="text-align:center;"|-
|- 
| style="text-align:left;"|Shiga Lakestars
| style="text-align:left;"|2019-20
| 41||21||20|||| style="text-align:center;"|3rd in Western|||-||-||-||
| style="text-align:center;"|-
|-

References

External links
Official blog

1965 births
Living people
Australian expatriate sportspeople in Japan
Australian expatriate sportspeople in New Zealand
Australian men's basketball coaches
Australian women's basketball coaches
Shiga Lakes coaches